The Tarija Concha Formation is a Tremadocian geologic formation of southern Bolivia. The shales and siltstones were deposited in a shallow marine environment.

Fossil content 
The formation has provided the following fossils:
 Bienvillia tetragonalis
 Leptoplastides granulosus
 Apatokephalus sp.

See also 
 List of fossiliferous stratigraphic units in Bolivia

References

Further reading 
 R. Suárez Soruco. 1976. El sistema ordovícico en Bolivia. Revista Tecnica YPF Bolivia 5(2):111-123

Geologic formations of Bolivia
Ordovician System of South America
Ordovician Bolivia
Tremadocian
Shale formations
Siltstone formations
Shallow marine deposits
Ordovician southern paleotemperate deposits
Geology of Tarija Department